Fujian Normal University is a public university in Fuzhou, China. FNU has been hailed as the Fujian province's "Cradle of teachers."

History
Tracing its origin back to Fujian Superior Normal School, founded in 1907, Fujian Normal University (FNU) is Fujian's oldest university and one of China's most time-honored teachers’ colleges. After the founding of the People's Republic of China, the school (which had been renamed Fujian Provincial Normal College) merged in 1953 with Fukian Christian University and Hua Nan Women's College to form a new and significantly expanded Fujian Normal College. The Fukian Christian University was founded by the Church Missionary Society in the Fukian Mission where Constance Bryant was the administrator. FNU acquired its current name in 1972.

Overview
In Fuzhou, the capital of Fujian province, FNU has two campuses — Qishan and Cangshan — with a land area of about 230 hectares.

The university consists of 28 colleges, which together offer 56 undergraduate programs, over 120 master programs (including those conferring professional degrees in pedagogy, public administration, physical culture and arts), about 50 doctoral programs and 7 post-doctoral research centers. These programs cover subject areas in literature, history, philosophy, physics, engineering, pedagogy, economics, law, business management, agriculture, etc. A balanced and coordinated development of this spectrum of disciplines has given FNU a distinct identity as a multi-discipline comprehensive university. By conferring a range of academic degrees, from bachelors to doctorates, these programs enable FNU to set up a full-fledged educational system in its institutional framework.

Training programs
In addition to regular academic programs, FNU has been authorized by the state to provide on-the-job training for teachers of elementary, secondary, occupational schools as well as colleges. It has been singled out for setting up experimental pilot programs in distance education and in teaching Chinese as a foreign language. It has been authorized to admit students from Taiwan on an experimental basis.

Teaching, however, is just one aspect of the dual task which FNU has taken on. To turn the university into a school oriented to both teaching and research, its faculty has been paying just as much attention to scientific investigations and scholarly pursuits. The efforts have started to pay off. The university is at present the proud host to as many as four national centers for scientific research and personnel training, eight key laboratories or research centers sponsored by the ministries concerned or the provincial government, one Ministry of Education sponsored research center for basic education, and several dozen of provincially sponsored laboratories and research institutes.

Students
Over 20,000 students are enrolled in the two campuses in Fuzhou, among whom over 4,600 are pursuing their graduate degrees. Some others are international students from 17 countries such as the U.S., the U.K., Japan, and the Republic of Korea, and from China's Hong Kong, Macao and Taiwan areas or from overseas Chinese families around the world.

International student life
Most of the international students come from neighbouring Asian countries, including Philippines, Indonesia, Malaysia, Vietnam, Japan, and Korea.

The International Students College is near many shopping areas including Student Street, Baolong Mall, Taijiang, and Dongbai Yuan Hong.

Faculty
FNU attaches the greatest importance to recruiting talented researchers and distinguished scholars for its teaching staff. Maintaining a high-quality, properly tiered, and professionally dedicated faculty has been its top priority. It has a 2,600-strong teaching and auxiliary staff.

Its faculty counts more than 700 full and associate professors, among whom two have been elected members of the Eurasian Academy of Sciences, seven have received the honorific title of "Young and Middle-aged Experts with Distinguished Services," two are members of the subject-specific advisory groups under the State Council Commission for Regulating Academic Degrees, six are "Professors Extraordinaire" or "Minjiang Scholars", one has been honored as "China’s Distinguished Teacher", six as "Fujian’s Distinguished Teachers," and 22 as "Fujian’s Distinguished Experts", to mention a fraction of the honors and recognitions won by FNU scholars.

Facilities
The university is noted for its fine facilities for teaching and research.

Its library holds a collection of as many as 2.86 million books. It is one of the largest libraries in normal universities throughout China. The library is famed internationally for its very impressive collections of ancient texts, rare books, rubbings of engraved tablets, photographs, calligraphic works and paintings, Fujian's local cultural and historical documents, early editions of foreign language publications, and major newspapers published during the historic period known as the May Fourth Movement.

The university is equipped with over 7,000 computers for teaching and research, over 100 multimedia classrooms, and more than 30 language laboratories. Among its facilities for conducting pedagogical and scientific experiments are a university computation center, an analyzing and testing center, a center of modern educational technologies, in addition to the 70-odd research institutes and centers run by its colleges. A high-speed intranet serves the campuses, and it is expanding rapidly to cater to the ever-increasing needs of the university community.

International education
Founded in 1988, the International College of Chinese Studies of the Fujian  Normal University (formerly International Cultural and Educational Exchange Center, FNU) was authorized by the State Education Commission as one of the four Chinese teaching bases to admit students from Southeast Asia. In 1997, it received its current name.

The International College of Chinese Studies undertakes the work of recruiting, teaching and advising foreign students for degree and non-degree courses. The school has a well-equipped administrative system, qualified teachers, and modest teaching and learning means. However, complaints have been filed by students with regard to the living conditions. Buildings and dormitories often do not meet appropriate safety standards.

Colleges and schools
School of Education
School of Economics
School of Liberal Arts
School of Communication
School of Social History
School of Law
School of Public Administration
School of Foreign Language
School of Music
School of Fine Arts
School of Physical Science
School of Mathematics and Computer Science
Faculty of Software
School of Physics and Electronics Technology
School of Environmental Science and Engineering
School of Life Science
School of Geographical Science
Minnan Institute of Technology (Fuqing Campus)
Concord University College

Notes

References

Citations

Sources 

 Yale University page about Chinese Universities
 Introduction of Fujian Normal University

Further reading 
 Fuijan Normal University, Alfred University Connection 1924-1961, W. Sutton

 
Teachers colleges in China
Educational institutions established in 1907
Universities and colleges in Fujian
Education in Fuzhou
1907 establishments in China